Lever is a former civil parish in the municipality of Vila Nova de Gaia, Portugal. In 2013, the parish merged into the new parish Sandim, Olival, Lever e Crestuma. The population in 2011 was 2,794, in an area of 7.84 km².

References

Former parishes of Vila Nova de Gaia